Leucocoprinus elaeidis (or elaidis) is a species of mushroom-producing producing fungus in the family Agaricaceae.  In the local language, it is commonly known as elela.

Taxonomy 
It was first described in 1927 by the Belgian mycologist Maurice Beeli who classified it as Lepiota elaeidis or (elaidis), whilst illustrations of the mushrooms were produced by Mme M. Goossens-Fontana.

In 1977 it was reclassified by the Belgian mycologist Paul Heinemann who classified it as Leucocoprinus elaeidis.

Description 
Leucocoprinus elaeidis is a dapperling mushroom with thin white flesh and stem flesh that may stain yellow.      

Cap: 7-12cm wide with thin 2mm thick flesh. The cap is a fluffy white and coated in white flakes or scales whilst the umbo or centre disc is sometimes tinged brown or yellowish. It starts bulbous and cylindrical before expanding to campanulate (bell shaped) and flattening further with age making the umbo more pronounced. There are slight striations at the cap edges. Gills: Free with a collar, crowded and white but yellowing when damaged. Stem: 7-9cm long and 8-12mm thick, expanding at the base to 15-20mm. The stem is hollow and easily detaches from the cap. White and smooth above the stem ring and scaly or flaky white below but staining yellow when touched or damaged. The movable stem ring is white and fluffy at the edges and is located towards the top of the cap (superior or apical). Spore print: White. Spores: Amygdaliform. 8.5-11 x 5.3-7.4 μm. Smell: Pleasant. Taste: Pleasant. When dry the mushroom develops an ochre colour whilst the gills discolour yellowish.

Habitat and distribution 
L. elaeidis is scarcely recorded and little known. It grows on the ground and in grass near elaeis, coffee and eucalyptus trees and is sometimes found on rotten wood or compost. 

The specimens studied by Beeli were found in groups in the grass at the foot of Elaeis oil palms in the Eala region of the Zaïre (now the Democratic Republic of the Congo). They were also found near lake Edward and lake Kivu to the North East of the country and have been observed in Mali and Senegal.

Similar species 
The description and illustrations of L. elaeidis suggest that the species is superficially similar to Leucocoprinus cretaceous or Leucocoprinus cepistipes but it is distinguished from them by the presence of yellow bruising.

References 

Leucocoprinus
Taxa named by Paul Heinemann
Fungi described in 1927
Fungi of Africa
Taxa named by Maurice Beeli